Tan Chay Yan (1870 - 6 March 1916) was a rubber plantation merchant and philanthropist. A Peranakan, Tan is the grandson of philanthropist Tan Tock Seng by his father, Tan Teck Guan.

Tan was noted in Malayan history as the first man to plant rubber on a commercial basis, after he was introduced to rubber planting by Henry Nicholas Ridley. Subsequently, Tan started a  rubber estate at Bukit Lintang. He then ventured his rubber plantation business into Sri Lanka. According to his family, Tan's rubber plantation still belonged to the family.

As a philanthropist, Tan also gave $15,000 towards the setting up of a medical college in Singapore. The donation went towards the construction of the Tan Teck Guan Building, which Tan named in memory of his late father. Tan also served as a Municipal Councillor and a Trustee of the Cheng Hoon Teng Temple.

There is a variety of orchid named Vanda Tan Chay Yan, according to one of the Peranakan Cina Melaka's annual dinner souvenir books, but there is no record of who named it such. The Vanda Tan Chay Yan was named by his son Robert Tan Hoon Siang who personally developed the hybrid. A road in Melaka was also named after him in view of his contributions to the country's revenue.

Tan died of malaria at the age of 46. A relative believed he could have caught it as he often spent the long hours spent at the rubber plantations. Tan left behind his wife, Chua Wan Neo, a tenth generation Nyonya, six daughters and a son.

For memorizing his contributions, there is a road called Chay Yan Street as named after him in Tiong Bahru, Singapore.

References

External links
 Newspaper article

Malaysian businesspeople
Malaysian philanthropists
Deaths from malaria
Peranakan people in Malaysia
1870 births
1916 deaths
19th-century philanthropists